Conway Christian School is a private, college preparatory Christian school serving students in grades K2 through 12 in Conway, Arkansas, United States. The school has a curriculum leading to several concurrent credit hours through local colleges. 100% of Conway Christian graduates attend college. Conway Christian is accredited the Arkansas Nonpublic School Accrediting Association (ANSAA).

Curriculum 
Conway Christian offers a college preparatory education with a biblical worldview.

Athletics 
The Conway Christian Eagles compete in the 2A Classification administered by the Arkansas Activities Association. Conway Christian offers the opportunity to participate in football, baseball, softball, volleyball, bowling (boys/girls), cross country (boys/girls), golf (boys/girls), basketball (boys/girls), cheer, tennis (boys/girls), and track and field (boys/girls). Conway Christian athletes have been successful at both the regional and state levels, and several athletes have accepted college athletic scholarships.

References

External links 

 

Christian schools in Arkansas
Conway Christian School
Private middle schools in Arkansas
Buildings and structures in Conway, Arkansas
Schools in Faulkner County, Arkansas